Hibbertia hibbertioides is a species of flowering plant in the family Dilleniaceae and is endemic to near-coastal areas of south-western Western Australia. It is a small, prostrate or sprawling shrub with crowded, linear cylindrical leaves and yellow flowers with usually eleven stamens arranged in groups around three carpels.

Description
There are usually eleven stamens, nine fused at the base in groups of three and one or two free, arranged around the three glabrous carpels that each contain one ovule.

Taxonomy
This species was first formally described in 1845 by Ernst Gottlieb von Steudel and given the name Pleurandra hibbertioides in Johann Georg Christian Lehmann's Plantae Preissianae. In 2002 Judith R. Wheeler changed the name to Hibbertia hibbertioides in the Journal of the Adelaide Botanic Gardens. The specific epithet (hibbertioides) means "Hibbertia-like", the species having originally been placed in the genus Pleurandra.

In 2004, Wheeler described three varieties in the journal Nuytsia and the names are accepted by the Australian Plant Census:
 Hibbertia hibbertioides (Steud.)

The varietal epithets mean "southern" (meridionalis) and "provided with a peduncle" (pedunculata) respectively.

Distribution and habitat
The variety hibbertioides is widespread in the far south-west of Western Australia where it grows in woodland and heath from Mount Lesueur to Dwellingup and inland to near Pingelly. Variety meridionalis grows in mallee and heath from near Hopetoun to near Esperance and var. pedunculata in woodland from near York to near Arthur River.

Conservation status
Hibbertia hibbertioides and each of the three varieties is classified as "not threatened" by the Western Australian Government Department of Parks and Wildlife.

See also
List of Hibbertia species

References

hibbertioides
Flora of Western Australia
Plants described in 1845
Taxa named by Ernst Gottlieb von Steudel